Vivian Johnson (or variants) may also refer to:

People
Vivien Johnson, Australian sociologist

Fictional characters
Vivian Baxter Johnson, mother of Maya Angelou and a character in her autobiographical works
Vivian Johnson, a fictional character in the television series Without A Trace.
Vivienne Johnson, a British actress best known for her role in Are You Being Served?